The Men's Al-Ahram International 2016 is the men's edition of the 2016 Al-Ahram International, which is a tournament of the PSA World Tour event International (Prize money : 100 000 $). The event took place in Cairo in Egypt from 19 to 23 September.

Prize money and ranking points
For 2016, the prize purse was $100,000. The prize money and points breakdown is as follows:

Seeds

Draw and results

See also
2016 PSA World Tour
Al-Ahram International
Women's Al-Ahram International 2016

References

External links
PSA Al-Ahram International 2016 website
Al-Ahram International 2016 SquashSite website

Squash tournaments in Egypt
Al-Ahram International Open
Al-Ahram International